The Purus jacamar (Galbalcyrhynchus purusianus) is a species of bird in the family Galbulidae. It is found in Bolivia, Brazil, and Peru.

Taxonomy and systematics

The Purus jacamar shares genus Galbalcyrhynchus with the white-eared jacamar (G. leucotis). They were originally treated a separate species, then as conspecific ("chestnut jacamar"), but are now understood to be separate species. The Purus jacamar is monotypic.

Description

It is stouter than many jacamars, and has a more robust bill. It is almost entirely chestnut, with dark bronzy forehead, crown, wings, and tail. The juvenile is paler and its bill is shorter.

Distribution and habitat

The Purus jacamar is found in the upper Amazon Basin of eastern Peru, western Brazil, and northern Bolivia.  In this humid region, it inhabits terra firme and várzea forest, both primary and secondary. It prefers edges such as along waterways and oxbow lakes.

Behavior

Feeding

The Purus jacamar preys on insects, with Hymenoptera (bees and wasps) and Isoptera (termites) favored. It perches at mid- to upper canopy height singly or in small groups and sallies out to capture its prey.

Breeding

The Purus jacamar has been documented excavating cavities in termite nests high in trees in Brazil and Peru. It is apparently a cooperative breeder, as the Peru cavity was excavated by six individuals and groups of up to six individuals have been noted singing together.

Vocalization

The Purus jacamar's vocalizations are essentially identical to those of white-eared jacamar. The song is a rising trill  and the calls "a series of loud 'peeeur' whistles and a sharp 'pee'” .

Status

The IUCN has assessed the Purus jacamar as being of Least Concern. It ranges from scarce in Peru to locally common in Brazil and "[a]pparently tolerates disturbed and partially man-modified habitats, and no specific threats are known."

References

Purus jacamar
Birds of the Amazon Basin
Birds of the Bolivian Amazon
Birds of the Peruvian Amazon
Purus jacamar
Taxonomy articles created by Polbot